Public holidays in the Falkland Islands are determined by the Executive Council of the Falkland Islands. There are currently nine annual public holidays in force in the Falklands, with several other observances throughout the year. When a public holiday falls on a Saturday or Sunday, the holiday is carried over to the following Monday.

Public holidays

Other observances

One-off public holidays
A one-off public holiday was declared for 19 September 2022, the day of Queen Elizabeth II's funeral.

References

Falkland Islands
Falkland Islands
Falkland Islands